The Princess may refer to:

In print
The Princess (Tennyson poem), an 1847 poem by Alfred, Lord Tennyson
The Princess (Maykov poem), an 1878 poem by Maykov
The Princess (Killigrew), a 17th-century play by Thomas Killigrew
The Princess (W. S. Gilbert play), an 1870 musical play by W. S. Gilbert, based on the Tennyson poem
"The Princess" (D. H. Lawrence story), a 1924 story by D. H. Lawrence
"The Princess" (Chekhov story), by Anton Chekhov

Films
The Princess (1966 film), a 1966 Swedish film
The Princess (1983 film) (Adj király katonát!), a Hungarian film directed by Pal Erdöss
The Princess (2022 action film), American fantasy action film
The Princess (2022 documentary film), documentary film about Diana, Princess of Wales

Sports
The Princess (golf), a golf tournament on the European Challenge Tour, held in Sweden

See also
Princess (disambiguation)